Prudential station is an underground light rail station on the MBTA Green Line E branch, located below Huntington Avenue next to the Prudential Tower complex near Belvidere Street in Boston, Massachusetts. Prudential station is fully handicapped accessible, featuring low raised platforms and elevator service to the Huntington Arcade of the Prudential Center shopping mall at the base of the Prudential Tower.

History

The first tracks on Huntington Avenue east of Brigham Circle were laid at least as far as Massachusetts Avenue around 1883. By the time the line was electrified in 1894, tracks were in place on Huntington Avenue all the way to Copley Square. Surface cars were rerouted into the Public Garden Portal when the Tremont Street subway opened in 1897. By 1903, a service from Park Street to Arborway – the E branch as it would run for eight decades – was fully in place. Service was shifted to the Boylston Street Portal in 1914.

By the 1930s, auto traffic through Copley Square and Boylston Street (which, unlike Huntington Avenue, lacked dedicated medians for trolleys) caused major delays to streetcars. Mechanics station (named for nearby Mechanics Hall) and Symphony station were opened on February 16, 1941, as the two new stations of the Huntington Avenue subway project. The project was constructed by the Works Progress Administration during the Great Depression and allowed streetcars from Huntington Avenue to go underground through Copley Square, cutting 15 minutes off trip times.

Mechanics station was renamed Prudential on December 3, 1964 upon completion of the Prudential Tower. In the 1970s, the headhouse on the inbound side was replaced during a widening of Huntington Avenue. The station was closed on Sundays for some time beginning on February 1, 1981 due to budget cuts. The station was made accessible in 2002-03 as part of the construction of 111 Huntington Avenue nearby.

However, as a cost-cutting measure they were changed to be the only two underground stops on the Green Line where riders paid upon boarding the train, rather than when entering the station. This was changed again in June 2006, when the MBTA installed the Charlie Card electronic fare collection system at Prudential and Symphony, allowing fares to be paid at the station entrances as with other underground stations on the system.

References

External links

MBTA – Prudential
Newton Street / Belvidere Street entrance from Google Maps Street View

Green Line (MBTA) stations
Prudential Financial
Railway stations located underground in Boston
Railway stations in the United States opened in 1941